The George Arbuckle House, at 747 E. 17th South in Salt Lake City, Utah, was built around 1890.  It was listed on the National Register of Historic Places in 1982.

It is a one-and-a-half-story brick, Late Gothic Revival-style house, with two steep front-facing gables.

It is located in the Sugar House neighborhood.

References

National Register of Historic Places in Salt Lake City
Gothic Revival architecture in Utah
Houses completed in 1890